The surname Jurka may refer to:

Blanche Jurka (1887-1974),  American stage and film actress and director
Jaroslav Jurka (born 1949), Czech fencer
Jerzy Jurka (1950–2014), Polish-American biologist
Miroslav Jurka (born 1987), Czech handball player
Timothy Jurka (born 1988), Polish-American computer scientist

See also